Magnolia is the score soundtrack to the film of the same name. It is composed by Jon Brion. A soundtrack release for the film with original music by Aimee Mann was previously issued in 1999. A ninth track is also based on the film.

Track listing
"A Little Library Music/Going to a Show" – 5:35
"Showtime" – 10:28
"Jimmy's Breakdown" – 4:24
"WDKK Theme" – 0:45
"I've Got a Surprise for You Today" – 6:12
"Stanley/Frank/Linda's Breakdown" – 11:00
"Chance of Rain" – 4:10
"So Now Then" – 3:51
"Magnolia" – 2:12

Jon Brion albums
2000 soundtrack albums
Drama film soundtracks